The Bloomingdale Troopers were a North Atlantic League baseball team based in Bloomingdale, New Jersey that played from 1946 to 1948. They were affiliated with the Boston Braves in 1947 and the Cleveland Indians in 1948. They are the only professional baseball team to ever play in Bloomingdale.

History 
The Bloomingdale Troopers were one of eight teams that competed in the inaugural 1946 season of the North Atlantic League, formed during the post-World War II minor league baseball boom in the United States. The league and its teams operated as a Class D affiliate of Major League Baseball, however, most of its teams operated independently of any major league clubs during the 1946 season.

The Bloomingdale team was named the "Troopers" after the original owner's son, who was a New Jersey State Police officer killed in the line of duty. They played their first game on May 8, 1946 in Peekskill, New York against the Highlanders, who were managed by former New York Yankees third baseman Joe Dugan. The next day, the Troopers played their first game at DeLazier Field in Bloomingdale, also against the Highlanders.

During the summer of 1946, former New York Yankees player Babe Ruth attended a Troopers game while in the area on a hunting and fishing trip. After the game, Ruth went onto the field and hit a few home runs for the record-setting crowd of 1,467 spectators.

The Troopers drew an average of 600 fans per game. Jim Lemon played for the team during their last season in 1948, before making it to the major leagues for Cleveland in 1950.

Season records

References

Bloomingdale, New Jersey
Baseball teams established in 1946
1946 establishments in New Jersey
Sports clubs disestablished in 1948
1948 disestablishments in New Jersey
Boston Braves minor league affiliates
Cleveland Guardians minor league affiliates
Defunct minor league baseball teams
Defunct baseball teams in New Jersey
Professional baseball teams in New Jersey
Baseball teams disestablished in 1948
North Atlantic League teams